Panahi is an Iranian surname and may refer to:

Jafar Panahi (born 1960), Iranian film director, screenwriter, and film editor
Hossein Panahi (1956–2004), Iranian actor and poet
Rita Panahi (born 1976), Iranian Australian opinion columnist
Anwar Hossein Panahi, Iranian Kurdish teacher and political activist